The Cumana railway (sometimes also known as Line 7) is a commuter railway in Campania, southern Italy, connecting Naples by two separate routes with Torregaveta, near Cuma in the town of Bacoli (about 15 km west of Naples). It passes through Pozzuoli and the volcanic Campi Flegrei area. The line was built and run by the Società per le Ferrovie Napoletane (the Neapolitan Railway Company), founded in 1883, and is now operated by the Ente Autonomo Volturno (EAV) company.

Overview 
The line was opened on 1 July 1889 by the Società per le Ferrovie Napoletane; the route follows the coast for about 20 km from the main terminal in the populous downtown area of Montesanto to Torregaveta via the stations of Corso Vittorio Emanuele, Fuorigrotta, Mostra, Bagnoli, Pozzuoli, Arco Felice, Baia and Fusaro.

In 1927 the railway, because of the increasing commuter traffic, was electrified with a 1,2 kV DC overhead line.

In 1940 the section in the neighbourhood of Fuorigrotta was reconstructed and put underground, with the new stations of Fuorigrotta and Mostra built in rational architecture style. In the same year the SFN give the line to the SEPSA, a branch of the EAV.

In 1962 the electrification was elevated from 1,2 to 3 kV, and the new ET 100 EMUs were put into service.

The increasing traffic has made it necessary to double the track, beginning in 1975. The doubling of the Montesanto-Bagnoli (8.5 km) and Arco Felice-Torregaveta (5.9 km) sections have been completed and work on the remaining section (Bagnoli-Arco Felice (5.7 km)) is well under way.

Route

Service 
Trains travel every 20 minutes.

See also 
 Metropolitana di Napoli
 List of suburban and commuter rail systems

References

Bibliography 
 Antonio Bertagnin: SEPSA in rinnovamento. In: ″TuttoTreno″ Nr. 150 (February 2002), p. 14–17.
Kalla-Bishop, P.M. (April 1966). "Through Neapolitan Suburbs: The Cumana Railway". Railway Magazine. pp. 223–226.

External links 

Railway lines in Campania
Transport in Naples
Railway lines opened in 1889
Phlegraean Fields